Takeshi Kawamoto (川本武史, Kawamoto Takeshi, born 19 February 1995) is a Japanese swimmer. He competed in the men's 50 metre butterfly event at the 2018 FINA World Swimming Championships (25 m), in Hangzhou, China.

References

External links
 

1995 births
Living people
People from Seto, Aichi
Japanese male butterfly swimmers
Swimmers at the 2020 Summer Olympics
Olympic swimmers of Japan
Medalists at the FINA World Swimming Championships (25 m)
21st-century Japanese people